Kim Nielsen may refer to
Kim Nielsen (cyclist) (born 1986), Danish cyclist
Kim Nielsen (guitarist) (born 1964), American hard rock bass guitar player
Kim Nielsen (wrestler) (born 1973), American professional wrestler and valet
Kim Herforth Nielsen (born 1954), Danish architect
Kim Milton Nielsen (born 1960), Danish football referee
Kim Østergaard Nielsen (born 1974), Danish footballer
Kim E. Nielsen American historian and author